Philip III may refer to:

Philip III, Duke of Burgundy (1419–1467)
Philip III of France (1245–1285)
Philip III of Macedon (c. 359–317 BC)
Philip III of Navarre (1328–1342)
Philip III of Portugal (1605–1665)
Philip III of Spain (1578–1621)
Philip III of Taranto, Prince of Achaea (1364–1373)

See also
Prince William, Duke of Cambridge (born 1982), possible future regnal name
Felipe III (disambiguation)

de:Liste der Herrscher namens Philipp#Philipp III.
eo:Filipo (regantoj)#Filipo la 3-a